Kim Kim Gallery is a contemporary art gallery run by Gregory Maass & Nayoungim, a German-Korean artist duo. The Gallery was founded at the Market Gallery in Glasgow, Scotland, in 2008. It describes itself as "a non-profit organization, locative art, an art dealership based on unconventional marketing, a curatorial approach, an exhibition design firm, and editor of rare artist books, depending on the situation it adapts to; in short, it does not fit the format imposed by the term Gallery".Clemens Krümmel writes, "This begins with the excess of dis-identificatory self-reference in creative dialogue with the institution Kim Kim Gallery, along with corporate identity and advertising products and a mania borrowed from Martin Kippenberger for 'great' work or exhibition titles".

Kim Kim Gallery is an institution which does not solely function in a gallery context, but through self-awareness evaluation and adaptation of KKG's structure to varying spatial, financial, and esthetic circumstances. It is a peripatetic enterprise, which infiltrates the structure of contemporary art through unconventional marketing and seeks formats in which art works can function efficiently and independently from the mainstream.

KKG has gained international recognition through their projects, including, among others: Douglasism at the international Art Fair, Art:Gwangju:12 in Korea the solo exhibition "Apple vs. Banana" of Chung Seo-young, voted one of the best shows in 2011 by the Art in Culture Magazine; and "More of the Best of Firmin Graf Salawàr dej Striës" by Jeff Gabel, exhibiting new large scale site-specific drawings on canvas rendered in pencil.
KKG contributed as exhibition designer to the Daegu Photo Biennial special exhibition in 2012.

Their latest project is "Douglasism", 
 
 
  a festival which took place in Seoul in October–November 2013, centered on the works of British artist Douglas Park 
 
 
 
 
, in collaboration with Komplot Brussels, Trinity ∴ and FLACC.

History 2008 - 2013

Apple vs. Banana

In the "Apple vs. Banana" show, Chung's work deals pragmatically and humorously with the grotesque sides of our daily life. The exhibition title derives from the futile choice between dietary fiber and carbohydrate.
In this show, Chung Seoyoung accentuates the bland, and produced a range of sober, pure and obviously inexpressive works of art. 
She built a set of objects: tables, a light bulb, a kitchenette, an aquarium, a spot, and snowballs constructing a certain encompassing physical and organizational structure in the model apartments. 
The time stood still on the second sub-level of the Hyundai Cultural Center in Seoul, where Kim Kim Gallery renovated and occupied two derelict model apartments from the early 1990s. About the Hyundai Cultural Center: Hyundai Group was founded as a construction company, which rapidly achieved legendary status.

Stuffs!

Nakhee and Nakyoung Sung are sisters.
The many painted faces, grimacing, sign-like, broadly applied seem to open a mimetic space-within-the-space. 
Some of Nakhee and Nakyoung Sung's gestures seem to me just as raw as if they had broken down the walls. 
"Their artistic intelligence and skill is not limited to languages of painting, it resides in the sometimes disharmonic, sometimes utterly willful, capricious application of their personal, intra-familial, professional ambivalences.
And since it lets outside images and sounds seep through the walls, it is on the way to break open any cube or preconception of painting."

More of the Best of Firmin Graf Salawàr dej Striës

In 2012, Jeff Gabel realised large site-specific drawings in graphite on wall-filling canvases for Kim Kim Gallery.
The images themselves tended to be awkward or inept, as Gabel employs no measurements or other preparation work, regardless of size.
The stories which accompany Gabel's images on walls or other surfaces typically develop as a drawing progresses, and are often suggested or driven by the physical spaces, and by conditions relating to the respective exhibitions, such as time limit, allotted space, exhibition content, travel logistics & problems, and the artist's recent readings.

At Kim Kim Gallery, Gabel attempts to translate, adapt, and illustrate various sections of "Salwàre oder Die Magdalena von Bozen" while consuming numerous servings of alcohol and copious amounts of chewing tobacco, deliberately influencing the voice and aptitude of the drawing and writing.

Douglasism

Douglasism is a term deriving from the name of the contemporary British artist Douglas Park.
Douglas Park is in his own words "born in 1972, UK visual artist, writer (of literary prose and critical essays, both mostly art connected), exhibition curator and multiple practices and roles combined."
Douglas Park is a polyvalent artist, actor, narrator, writer, curator. He has a vast but strangely intangible oeuvre of great humanism. 
These works often displayed by, or are co-created with Douglas Park.
Douglasism provides a deeper insight into the working methods, perspectives and traits of work by and with Douglas Park.  The origin of the term "Douglasism" lies in a title of a show curated by the late Piers Wardle aka Lewis Draper. Kim Kim Gallery adopted this title and consider Douglasism as a many-layered perspective on the totality of the creative activity of Douglas Park. The term “Douglasism” compares to political movements and art movements of the 19th and early 20th century. It is not solely the work of Douglas Park but also engulfs the works of many other artists, with whom Douglas Park works up to the present.

Contributing artists included among others: Claire Fontaine 
, Nico Dockx, Aeon Rose, Jan Mast, Richard Crow, Mark Aerial Waller, Christine Mitrentse, Monika K. Adler, Olive Martin, Anthony Gross, Michelle Naismith, Gideon Cube Sherman, Cel Crabeels, Marc Vaulbert de Chantilly, Owen Piper.

Exhibited Artists

 Klaus Weber
 Sophie von Hellermann
 Geert Goiris
 Stefan Ettlinger
 Jeff Gabel
 Douglas Park
 Chung Seoyoung
 Nakhee Sung
 Nakyoung Sung
 Robert Estermann
 Nicolai Seyfarth
 Ingo Baumgarten

References

External links
Official website
Kim Kim Gallery blog
Maass and Nayoungim official website 
Douglasism official blog
Robert Estermann Wikipedia

Art museums and galleries in Germany
Art galleries established in 2008
2008 establishments in Scotland